"Homesick" is the fourth and final single from the Vines' debut album Highly Evolved. The single, which was only released in Australia, peaked in the ARIA Singles Chart top 50. Four different versions of the single were released, with each single featuring a portrait of a band member and different B-sides.

Track listing

Charts

References 

The Vines (band) songs
2003 singles
2001 songs
Songs written by Craig Nicholls
EMI Records singles